The Arboretum Vrahovice is a small arboretum in Vrahovice, Czech Republic. 

The Arboretum Vrahovice was established by Spolek za staré Vrahovice in 2010 and developed between 2010 and 2015. The Arboretum contains trees and bushes originating from North America, Europe and Asia.
 It is open to the public without charge.

References

External links 
 Arboretum Vrahovice Official website

Arboreta